Arearea no varua ino is an 1894 painting by Paul Gauguin, now in the Ny Carlsberg Glyptotek in Copenhagen.

References

Paintings by Paul Gauguin
1894 paintings
Paintings in the collection of the Ny Carlsberg Glyptotek
19th-century paintings in Denmark